The 1966 Ohio Bobcats football team was an American football team that represented Ohio University in the Mid-American Conference (MAC) during the 1966 NCAA University Division football season. In their ninth season under head coach Bill Hess, the Bobcats compiled a 5–5 record (3–3 against MAC opponents), finished in fourth place in the MAC, and were outscored by all opponents by a combined total of 183 to 149.  They played their home games in Peden Stadium in Athens, Ohio.

The team's statistical leaders included Bob Houmard with 641 rushing yards, Ron Delucca with 655 passing yards, and Jay Maupin with 447 receiving yards.

Schedule

References

Ohio
Ohio Bobcats football seasons
Ohio Bobcats football